José Torres (born 1903, date of death unknown) was a Mexican long-distance runner. He competed in the marathon at the 1928 Summer Olympics.

References

1903 births
Year of death missing
Athletes (track and field) at the 1928 Summer Olympics
Mexican male long-distance runners
Mexican male marathon runners
Olympic athletes of Mexico
People from Chihuahua City
20th-century Mexican people